Situated just outside Nieuwoudtville, the Hantam National Botanical Garden is the youngest of South Africa's nine National Botanical Gardens and the first National Botanical Garden in the Northern Cape, South Africa.

The park is 5 km southeast of the town, along the Oorlogskoof trail. The winter rains on the Bokkevelt Plateau lead to massive blooms from August to the middle of October. 1,350 plant species are recorded here. The garden has many bulbs and the geology includes formations in dolerite outcroppings. Many birds go there, such as blue cranes and secretarybirds, as do Cape foxes, baboons, steenboks, and porcupines.

It is the only national botanical garden in the Northern Cape and covers 6,200 ha, mostly covered with renosterveld. Nine hiking trails run through the park.

See also 
List of botanical gardens in South Africa
Hantam karoo

External links 

 South African National Biodiversity Institute
 Hantam National Botanical Garden Homepage

Botanical gardens in South Africa